Jinfeng is a town under the administration of Jiulongpo District, Chongqing, China. , it has 3 residential communities and 7 villages under its administration.

References 

Jiulongpo District
Township-level divisions of Chongqing